'''NICKLEBERRY, TX.Nickleberry is on Farm Road 1399 two miles southeast of Marietta in northwestern Cass County. In the 1940s the focus of the community was a district school for black students. It was named after the family of Tip Nickleberry, a black family who owned land and farmed in the area in the early 1900s. In 1983 the town consisted of a school, a church, and a business. Nickleberry was still shown on county highway maps in 2000. No population figures were ever recorded.

References

Unincorporated communities in Cass County, Texas
Unincorporated communities in Texas